Kimle is a village in Győr-Moson-Sopron County, Hungary.

Districts 
 Magyarkimle (Kimling)
 Horvátkimle (Kemlja)
 Károlyháza
 Novákpuszta

External links 
 Street map 

Populated places in Győr-Moson-Sopron County
Croatian communities in Hungary
Hungarian German communities